Alan Lamb may refer to:

 Alan Lamb (footballer, born 1952), Scottish footballer
 Alan Lamb (footballer, born 1970), English footballer
 Alan Lamb (musician), Australian artist, composer, and sound sculptor
 Allan Lamb, English cricketer

See also
Allen-Lambe House